Bunka Parish is an administrative unit of South Kurzeme Municipality in the Courland region of Latvia. The parish has a population of 980 (as of 1/07/2013) and covers an area of 110.85 km2.

Villages of Bunka parish 
 Bunka
 Krote
 Tadaiķi

References

Parishes of Latvia
South Kurzeme Municipality
Courland